Ernesto Corradi (born 1893, date of death unknown) was an Italian modern pentathlete. He competed at the 1924 Summer Olympics.

References

External links
 

1893 births
Year of death unknown
Italian male modern pentathletes
Olympic modern pentathletes of Italy
Modern pentathletes at the 1924 Summer Olympics